Fly Wex was a cargo airline based in Brescia, Italy. It operated domestic cargo services and international services in Europe. Its main base was Brescia Airport.

History

Fleet
Fly Wex operated the following aircraft (at March 2007): 
1 Fokker F27-500RF

See also
 List of defunct airlines of Italy

External links

References

Italian companies established in 2001
2007 disestablishments in Italy
Defunct airlines of Italy
Airlines established in 2001
Defunct cargo airlines
Airlines disestablished in 2007
Cargo airlines of Italy